Gravel cycling, gravel biking or gravel grinding is a sport, or a leisure activity, in which participants ride bicycles mostly on gravel roads. Sometimes, specially designed gravel bikes are used; in other cases, any bicycle capable of covering the terrain can be used.

Gravel cycling bridges the gap between road and mountain biking, combining the higher speed and efficiency of road cycling with the capability and freedom to ride on rough and loose terrain. While a small number of road races embrace long stretches of unpaved and gravel roads, notable the prestigious Italian classic Strade Bianche, gravel racing as a discipline has its own global series and world championship.

Gravel racing 
The distinguishing features of gravel races, also called gravel grinders, include long distances, often , mostly on gravel roads, and mass starts that include all categories of racers, similar to Gran Fondo rides.

The bicycles and courses in gravel racing vary widely, from road bicycles with wide tires used on smooth gravel roads to bicycles that are similar to mountain bikes used on courses that include technical trails.

History of gravel racing

End of 19th century - beginning of 20th century 
In the early days of road bike racing, most roads were not paved, so most races were held primarily on unpaved/dirt/gravel roads.

Due to road infrastructure improving with time, road bike racing shifted almost entirely to paved roads. In America the use of paved roads was largely influenced by a group of cyclists called League of American Wheelmen, who advocated for improving road conditions. Racing bikes got narrow tires and were no longer fit for off-road usage.

20th century 
Next to road bike racing, separate off-road cycling disciplines emerged. In autumn and winter in a few European countries, cyclo-cross is a popular professional sport. Cyclo-crossers ride off-road (on grass, sand, mud...) on a variant of a road bicycle, on a closed circuit during a relatively short time (1 hour), and jump or carry their bikes over obstacles or on steep climbs.

In the 1970s mountainbiking emerged.

21st century 
In the 21st century, riding and racing road bikes on gravel roads has gained popularity. Gravel cycling, as a mixture of road cycling, cyclo-cross and mountain biking became a new discipline of bicycle racing.

United States 
The revival started in the Mid-West of the USA, where gravel cycling evolved from cyclists riding long stretches of gravel and fire roads.
Some precursors to gravel racing in its current form include road races like the Tour of the Battenkill and Boulder–Roubaix (named after Paris–Roubaix) which are road races with gravel sections.

This race is a good example of how much gravel biking has grown in recent years: in 2006 there was a total of 34 riders that participated in the  race. In June 2019, 2,750 riders lucky enough to be picked from a lottery crossed the start line of the Dirty Kanza 200 and organizers had to introduce other mileage categories.

World 
Starting in 2010, the Pirate Cycling League in Lincoln, Nebraska started Gravel Worlds. Their grassroots movement gathered steam and as of 2022 is one of the largest gravel races in the world. In 2021, Gravel Worlds® received their registered trademark officially becoming THE Gravel Worlds. Thousands of riders from around the world race Gravel Worlds every year in Lincoln, Nebraska in late August. Champions of this event receive a world championship jersey, a pirate sword trophy, and the title of World Champion and "Captian of the Gravel Seas".  

In 2021, the UCI announced they will sanction in 2022 both the Gravel World Series with about 18 races in 4 continents, and the UCI Gravel World Championships. This first edition of the Championship will be held in Veneto in October and the Dutch champion, Mathieu van der Poel is amongst the favoris with Peter Sagan, Nicolas Roche and Alex Howes.

Racing rules and culture 

If riders receive outside support at any location other than official checkpoints it will result in immediate disqualification.  Riders may assist other riders by any means and at any time.

The culture of gravel biking has been a reason it has grown in popularity. Gravel races rarely call for a team of coaches and bicycle technicians because the courses susceptible to varying weather that is hard to train and prepare for. Gravel riders are generally focused on getting through a course rather than maintaining a pace during races. This give way to camaraderie on the trail and caters to a fun and relaxed atmosphere that is not always present in road and mountain bike races.

Other races

USA 
Barry-Roubaix is an up to  road/off-road cycling race in Barry County, Michigan. The event is known as the World's Largest Gravel Road Race.

Gravel Rankings and World Championship 
Gravel cycling as a whole has no governing body such as the UCI or USADA. Each race has its own rules, ethos, and character. Despite the balkanization of the races, a professional field of racers does exist, with each racer creating their own schedule of event to participate in. An independent organization called Pure Gravel has created a ranking system called the "Pure Gravel Power Rankings" in order to score and rank professional gravel racers across the myriad gravel races throughout the year. A king and Queen of gravel are crowned at the end of every calendar year.

Other major gravel events

Europe 
In Norway, Sweden and Finland, the Nordic Gravel Series are a series of gravel challenges

Gravel bicycle touring and bikepacking 
Riding on gravel roads has always been a part of bicycle touring, since its start in the 20th century. Also, already before the recent popularity of gravel bikes, part of the cycle tourists were riding what we would now call gravel bikes. Before, these bicycles.were often sold as dedicated touring bicycles, and seen as variants of randonneur bicycles.

Since the 2010s, gravel cycling and gravel bikes have been widely associated with one of the variants of bikepacking. Bikepacking is a form of traveling by bike with lightweight luggage but without bicycle racks or panniers (often off-road), so it is a lightweight variant of bicycle touring.

Gravel bikes 

The bicycles that cyclists use in gravel races and gravel rides can vary widely (can also be mountain bikes, cyclo-cross bicycles or racing bicycles with wider tires, depending on the conditions).

However, since the 2010s, a dedicated type of bicycle is marketed as gravel bike to cover the new cycling discipline. Dedicated gravel group sets are available from three major vendors (Shimano, SRAM and Campagnolo). Compared to road groupsets, gravel groupsets tend to have features from MTB groupsets like a clutched rear derailleur (to keep chain tension on when riding on uneven surfaces to avoid chain jumping), lower gearing options (lower than 1:1, bigger sprockets and/or smaller chainrings, like for example a super-compact 48/32T or 46/30T chainset and a 11-34T cassette), and a wider side-to-side chainline for more tire clearance.

Gravel bikes at first glance look very similar to road bikes with their drop bars and lack of suspension.

Where gravel bikes differ from road bikes is that the bars are usually wider, geometry is adapted to be more comfortable riding offroad for long periods of time and modern gravel bikes will also feature a 1x drivetrain removing the front derailleur. Wheels are generally wider and forks and rear triangle will allow for much wider tyres to cope with the terrain and requirements of riding off-road. 

The relaxed geometry of mountain bikes is the foundation of gravel bike frames but gravel bikes are lighter, faster and more responsive than a mountain bike. Gravel bikes also use characteristics of both cyclocross and road bikes for better comfort on long rides and the wheel clearance to accommodate rides done in torrential conditions (heavy rain).

Still, gravel bikes vary, and the different models cover a range between road racing bicycles and mountain bikes.

References

Cycle sport
Gravel roads
Cycle racing by discipline